Shinga is a town in Jigawa State of Nigeria. It is part of the Hadejia Local Government Area.  It lies at an elevation of 337 meters on the banks of a tributary of the Hadejia River.

Notes

Populated places in Jigawa State